The IBM La Gaude Study and Research Center (Centre d'études et recherches IBM La Gaude) was a computer research laboratory for IBM, located in La Gaude near Nice on the Côte d'Azur. In the 1990s, it became a presentation center for IBM Business Solutions. IBM left this site for the city of Nice in 2015.

World's first computer-controlled business telephone systems
French IBM engineers developed the world's first computer-controlled business telephone systems at IBM La Gaude near Nice in France.

1962 laboratory relocation from Paris to near Nice
IBM moved its French research and product-development laboratory from Paris to a spectacular, purpose-built, 35,000 square-metre building, designed by the architect Marcel Breuer, in 23 hectares of rough countryside near the village of La Gaude overlooking Nice and Nice airport. IBM chose the location because it could attract the cream of French engineers to work on the French Riviera, it was close to France's second-largest airport, and because it complied with the French government's policy to decentralize from Paris and build away from urban centres.

Initially 700 people, mostly engineers, worked there. By 1987 there were 1,500 engineers in the original B1 building. The B2 building was built in 1969 and B3 (with a patio) in 1978. From 1984 to 1986 reinforcements were made to reduce the risk of earthquake damage. Staff included IBM employees from other European countries and the USA. In 2015 most staff were displaced to a new centre nearer Nice.

Products
IBM La Gaude developed telecommunication products for IBM's worldwide markets. For European markets there were the IBM 1750, 2750 and 3750 Switching Systems (world-wide the first electronic computer-controlled business telephone systems widely called PABXs — Private Automatic Branch Exchanges). For world markets La Gaude engineers developed the IBM 270x series of communication controllers, modems, and other IBM products.

In 1963, IBM La Gaude established a satellite link to IBM Endicott in the USA — at 3,300 words per minute.

Relocation from La Gaude
On 25 October 2007, more than 200 employees demonstrated against the transfer of personnel to AT&T.

Some IBM staff continued to work at IBM La Gaude; the buildings are also used by other organisations.

References

IBM facilities
Modernist architecture in France
Research institutes in France
Buildings and structures in Alpes-Maritimes
Defunct organizations based in France
Research institutes established in 1962
Marcel Breuer buildings